Italian submarine Gondar was an  built for the Royal Italian Navy (Regia Marina) during the 1930s. It was named after a city of Gondar in northern Ethiopia.

Design and description
The Adua-class submarines were essentially repeats of the preceding . They displaced  surfaced and  submerged.

For surface running, the boats were powered by two  diesel engines, each driving one propeller shaft. When submerged each propeller was driven by a  electric motor. They could reach  on the surface and  underwater.

The boats were armed with six internal  torpedo tubes, four in the bow and two in the stern. One reload torpedo was carried for each tube, for a total of twelve. They were also armed with one  deck gun for combat on the surface. The light anti-aircraft armament consisted of one or two pairs of   machine guns.

Construction and career
Gondar was launched on 3 October 1937 in OTO's shipyard in La Spezia and commissioned on 28 September 1938. Initially, she was assigned to 14th Squadron based at La Spezia. After intensive training and exercises, in August of 1938 Gondar was reassigned to the III Submarine Group based at Leros. During 1939, Gondar made a long endurance training in the Dodecanese, and in February of 1940 the submarine was temporarily assigned to Messina, and finally in May 1940 she became a part of 15th Squadron (I Submarine group) based at La Spezia.

At the outbreak of hostilities she was immediately sent on a mission to patrol an area along the French coast and Gulf of Genoa. She returned to the base on 14 June 1940 without encountering any enemy traffic.

After completing two more missions, one 20 miles east of Cape Antibes from 18 to 25 June 1940, and the other off the Strait of Gibraltar from 5 to 16 August 1940, Gondar was moved into Arsenal at La Spezia to convert her into SLC carrying submarine. Three SLC(Siluro a Lunga Corsa which means long running torpedo) units were fitted onto the boat on her deck, two placed side by side in the aft, and one on her bow, the submarine's deck gun was also removed to accommodate SLC units.

On 21 September 1940 Gondar, under command of captain  Francesco Brunetti, sailed from La Spezia to raid the naval base of Alexandria, after the first attempt by Iride had failed. In the evening of September 23, 1940 Gondar arrived in Messina, where she embarked on an SLC unit of six officers, one NCO and 3 sailors. On 25 September 1940 she secretly left for Alexandria. On 29 September Gondar was ordered to head to Tobruk, as the British naval force had sortied from Alexandria. While on her way to Tobruk, at 20:30 on the same day, Gondar spotted an enemy ship, about 1,500 meters away. The submarine tried to disengage by diving to 80 meters, however, she was almost immediately detected by ASDIC of destroyer  who immediately attacked the submarine with depth charges. The ongoing depth charge attacks caused serious damage to the submarine and especially to the SLC units which were beginning to flood. At 8:30 on September 30, 1940, Gondar had to surface, due to sustained damage and almost completely exhausted reserves of oxygen. Upon surfacing, the crew scuttled the boat with explosive charges. Except for electrician Luigi Longobardi, who was killed by one of the bombs dropped by a Sunderland flying boat, the entire crew was rescued and imprisoned by the British.

With sinking of Gondar, the British intelligence noted the three cylinders on the deck of the submarine, and a presence of numerous divers among the crew. That raised questions about existence of special units in Regia Marina responsible for penetration into enemy ports.

Notes

References
 

Adua-class submarines
World War II submarines of Italy
Lost submarines of Italy
Maritime incidents in September 1940
World War II shipwrecks in the Mediterranean Sea
1937 ships
Ships built by OTO Melara
Ships built in La Spezia
Submarines sunk by British warships
Submarines sunk by Australian warships